Palupera Parish was a rural municipality of the Estonian county of Valga.

Settlements
Villages
Astuvere - Atra - Hellenurme - Lutike - Mäelooga - Makita - Miti - Neeruti - Nõuni - Päidla - Palupera - Räbi - Pastaku - Urmi

References